Owl Creek is a stream in Lafayette County in the U.S. state of Missouri. It is a tributary of Sni-A-Bar Creek.

Owl Creek was named for the owls near its course.

See also
List of rivers of Missouri

References

Rivers of Lafayette County, Missouri
Rivers of Missouri